The Salar Jung family was a noble Hyderabad family under the Nizams, who ruled from 1720 to 1948. They are credited with safeguarding rare artifacts and collections, which are now at Salar Jung Museum. 

The family were one of the remaining families of nobles other than the three great Paigah nobles, (who were the highest order of nobility under the Nizams) and after them ranked the Umra-e-Uzzam families. The Salar Jung family was one of the Umra-e-Uzzam. Their ancestry dates to the 16th century. By the middle of the 19th century, the family assumed importance as five members served as Grand Viziers to the Nizams. 

The family resided at the Dewan Devdi palace. 

The five Prime Ministers from the family are buried at Daira Mir Momin, a graveyard in the old city of Hyderabad. Prince Moazzam Jah and classical musician Bade Ghulam Ali Khan are also buried there. 

They claimed descent from Owais al-Qarani,who lived in the times of Prophet Muhhammad. According to the legend their claimed ancestor Shaikh Owais II who was tenth in descent from Owais,arrived in India during the reign of Ali Adil Shah of Bijapur,and established himself by marrying his son Shaikh Muhammad Ali to Minister Mulla Ahmad Nawayet's daughter. 

The family's Jagir comprised six taluks: Kosgi, Ajanta, Koppal, Yelburga, Dundgal, Raigir which had a total of 333 villages with a population of 180,150 (1901),spread over an area of 1.486 square miles that produced a revenue of 820,000.

Members

 Mir
 Turab Ali Khan, Salar I
 Mir Laiq Ali Khan Salar Jung II 
 Mir Yousuf Ali Khan, Salar Jung III

See also
 Salar Jung Museum

References

External links

 The Salar Jungs

 
Telugu people
People from Hyderabad State